The NFPA 72 (National Fire Alarm and Signaling Code) is a standard published by the National Fire Protection Association every 3 years for installation of fire alarm systems and emergency communication systems in the United States.

Purpose 
The NFPA 72 "covers the application, installation, location, performance, inspection, testing, and maintenance of fire alarm systems, supervising station alarm systems, public emergency alarm reporting systems, fire warning equipment and emergency communications systems (ECS), and their components." Federal, state, and local municipalities across the United States have adopted the NFPA 72 as a standard in the enforcement of fire code regulation. Municipalities often adopt revisions of the code after years of review and amendments, making many local fire codes specific to their governing authorities.

Structure 
The NFPA 72 2022 (Current) is sectioned as follows:

 Chapter 1 Administration
 Chapter 2 Referenced Publications
 Chapter 3 Definitions
 Chapter 4 Reserved
 Chapter 5 Reserved
 Chapter 6 Reserved
 Chapter 7 Document
 Chapter 8 Reserved
 Chapter 9 Reserved
 Chapter 10 Fundamentals
 Chapter 11 Reserved
 Chapter 12 Circuits and Pathways
 Chapter 13 Reserved
 Chapter 14 Inspection, Testing, and Maintenance
 Chapter 15 Reserved
 Chapter 16 Reserved
 Chapter 17 Initiating Devices
 Chapter 18 Notification Appliances
 Chapter 19 Reserved
 Chapter 20 Reserved
 Chapter 21 Emergency Control Function Interfaces
 Chapter 22 Reserved
 Chapter 23 Protected Premises Alarm and Signaling Systems
 Chapter 24 Emergency Communications Systems (ECS)
 Chapter 25 Reserved
 Chapter 26 Supervising Station Alarm Systems
 Chapter 27 Public Emergency Alarm Reporting Systems
 Chapter 28 Reserved
 Chapter 29 Single- and Multiple-Station Alarms and Household Signaling Systems
 Annex A Explanatory Material
 Annex B Engineering Guide for Automatic Fire Detector Spacing
 Annex C System Performance and Design Guide
 Annex D Speech Intelligibility
 Annex E Sample Ordinance Adopting NFPA 72
 Annex F Wiring Diagrams and Guide for Testing Fire Alarm Circuits
 Annex G Guidelines for Emergency Communication Strategies for Buildings and Campuses
 Annex H Carbon Monoxide
 Annex I Informational References
 Index

The previous version of NFPA 72 (2016) was sectioned as follows:

 1. Administration
 2. References and Publications
 3. Definitions
 4. Reserved
 5. Reserved
 6. Reserved
 7. Documentation
 8. Reserved
 9. Reserved
 10. Fundamentals
 11. Reserved
 12. Circuits and Pathways
 13. Reserved
 14. Inspection, Testing, and Maintenance
 15. Reserved
 16. Reserved
 17. Initiating Devices
 18. Notification Appliances
 19. Reserved
 20. Reserved
 21. Emergency Control Interfaces
 22. Reserved
 23. Protected Premises Fire Alarm Systems
 24. Emergency Communications Systems (ECS)
 25. Reserved
 26. Supervision Station Alarm Systems
 27. Public Emergency Alarm Reporting Systems
 28. Reserved
 29. Single and Multiple-Station Alarms and Household Fire Alarm Systems
 Annex A
 Annex B
 Annex C
 Annex D
 Annex E
 Annex F
 Annex G Informational References
 Index

References

Firefighting in the United States
Safety codes
Safety organizations
Electrical standards
NFPA Standards